Miles Teel Bivins (November 22, 1947 – October 26, 2009) was an American diplomat and politician. He served as a Republican member for the 31st district of the Texas Senate, and also as the 18th United States Ambassador to the Kingdom of Sweden.

Life and career
Born in Amarillo, Texas, Bivins was the son of Betty Teel Lovell and Lee Truscott Bivins. He had three brothers. He attended the Colorado Academy and then Tulane University, where he earned his Bachelor of Arts degree in 1970. He also attended Southern Methodist University's law school, where he earned his Juris Doctor degree in 1974.

In 1989, Bivins won election in the 31st district of the Texas Senate. He succeeded politician Bill Sarpalius. Bivins was listed in Texas Monthly's "The Best and Worst Legislators" four times. In 2004, he was succeeded by Kel Seliger in a special election.

Bivins then served as the 18th United States Ambassador to the Kingdom of Sweden, having been nominated by President George W. Bush. In 2006, Bivins became ill and resigned from his post; he was succeeded by Michael M. Wood.

Bivins returned to the United States to reside in Texas.  He endowed the Teel Bivins Chair of Political Science at West Texas A&M University.

Bivins died in October 2009 in Texas, at the age of 61.

Election history
Election history of Bivins from 1992.

Most recent election

2002

Previous elections

1998

1994

1992

References

External links 
Teel Bivins, U.S. Ambassador to Sweden

1947 births
2009 deaths
Politicians from Amarillo, Texas
Republican Party Texas state senators
Ambassadors of the United States to Sweden
Tulane University alumni
Southern Methodist University alumni
20th-century American politicians
21st-century American politicians
Colorado Academy alumni
American diplomats
21st-century American diplomats